Lincoln Museum can refer to:

Abraham Lincoln Birthplace National Historical Park
 Abraham Lincoln Presidential Library and Museum, Springfield, Illinois, USA
 Abraham Lincoln Library and Museum at Lincoln Memorial University, Harrogate, Tennessee, USA
 The Collection (Lincolnshire), Lincoln, Lincolnshire, UK — formed from the City and County Museum
 The Lincoln Museum (Fort Wayne, Indiana) — a repository for Lincoln Financial Foundation's Abraham Lincoln memorabilia; closed to the public in 2008 
 Ford's Theatre, Washington, DC, USA — where Abraham Lincoln was assassinated; known as Lincoln Museum from 1936 to 1965 and legally "Ford's Theater (Lincoln Museum)" since 1965
 The Lincoln Museum (Hodgenville, Kentucky)

See also
 :Category:Museums in Lincoln, Nebraska
 :Category:Museums in Lincolnshire